Newton is a residential neighbourhood located in north east Edmonton, Alberta, Canada.  It is named for Reverend William Newton who arrived in Edmonton in 1875. The Anglican canon served the people of Edmonton until 1900. The Hermitage, a hospital he founded just east of the old town, is now the Hermitage area of Edmonton. The neighbourhoods of Newton and Canon are named after him.

The neighbourhood is bounded on the south by Alberta (118) Avenue, on the north by the Yellowhead Trail, on the east by 50 Street, and on the west by 58 Street.

Northlands Coliseum and the Coliseum LRT Station are located a short distance to the west of the neighbourhood.

The community is represented by the Newton Community League, established in 1954, which maintains a community hall and outdoor rink located at 55 Street and 121 Avenue.

Demographics 

Residential development 
Development of Newton, according to the 2001 federal census, began prior to the end of World War II when roughly one in twelve (8.8%) of residences were built.  Just under half of the residences (45.8%) were built during the first fifteen years following the end of the war, that is, between 1946 and 1960.  One in six residences (15.4%) were constructed during the 1970s and another one in six (18.0%) were constructed during the 1980s.  The remaining residences were all constructed after 1990.

The most common type of dwelling in Newton, accounting for seven out of every eight (88%) of residences according to the 2005 municipal census, is the single-family dwelling.  Another 7% are rented apartments and apartment style condominiums in low-rise buildings with fewer than five stories.  Almost all of the remaining structures (4%) are duplexes.  Four out of five (79%) of residences are owner-occupied.

Schools 
St. Leo Catholic Elementary School, operated by the Edmonton Catholic School System, is the only active school in the neighbourhood.  Newton Elementary School, founded in 1955, was closed by the Edmonton Public School Board at the end of the 2006/07 school year, due in part to declining attendance.

Surrounding neighbourhoods

See also 
 Edmonton Federation of Community Leagues

References

External links 
 Newton Neighbourhood Profile

Neighbourhoods in Edmonton